Richard O'Keeffe (7 December 1870 – 2 April 1941) was an Irish sportsperson. He played hurling with his local club Tubberadora and was a member of the Tipperary senior hurling team between 1898 and 1905.

Honours

Tipperary
All-Ireland Senior Hurling Championship (2): 1898, 1899
Munster Senior Hurling Championship (2): 1898, 1899

References

1870 births
1941 deaths
Tipperary inter-county hurlers
All-Ireland Senior Hurling Championship winners